This is a list of members of the South Australian House of Assembly from 2006 to 2010, as elected at the 2006 state election.

 The Liberal member for Frome, Rob Kerin, resigned on 11 November 2008. Independent candidate Geoff Brock won the resulting by-election held on 17 January 2009.

Members of South Australian parliaments by term
21st-century Australian politicians